Oliver Simon D'Arcy Hart (born October 9, 1948) is a British-born American economist, currently the Lewis P. and Linda L. Geyser University Professor at Harvard University. Together with Bengt R. Holmström, he received the Nobel Memorial Prize in Economic Sciences in 2016.

Biography

Oliver Hart was born in Britain to Philip D'Arcy Hart, a medical researcher, and Ruth Meyer, a gynecologist. Both his parents were Jewish; his father was a member of the Montagu family; Oliver's great-grandfather was Samuel Montagu, 1st Baron Swaythling.

Hart earned his B.A. in mathematics at King's College, Cambridge, in 1969 (where his contemporaries included the former Bank of England Governor Mervyn King), his M.A. in economics at the University of Warwick in 1972, and his Ph.D. in economics at Princeton University in 1974. He completed his doctoral dissertation, titled "Essays in the economics of uncertainty", under the supervision of Michael Rothschild. He was a Lecturer in Economics at University of Essex, a fellow at Churchill College, Cambridge, and then a professor at the London School of Economics.  In 1984, he returned to the U.S., where he taught at the Massachusetts Institute of Technology and, since 1993, at Harvard University. He became the first Andrew E. Furer Professor of Economics in 1997 and was chairman of the Harvard economics department from 2000 to 2003. He is a fellow of the American Academy of Arts and Sciences, of the Econometric Society, of the American Finance Association, a corresponding fellow of the British Academy, and a member of the National Academy of Sciences. He has been president of the American Law and Economics Association and vice president of the American Economic Association, and has several honorary degrees.

In 2016, Hart won the Nobel Prize in Economics with Bengt Holmström for their work on contract theory, including his work on how ownership should be allocated and when contracting is beneficial over ownership.

Academics
Hart is an expert on contract theory, theory of the firm, corporate finance, and law and economics. His research centers on the roles that ownership structure and contractual arrangements play in the governance and boundaries of corporations. His research has emphasized the importance of contractual incompleteness — the inability of parties to contract on every contingency. He has used his theoretical work on firms in two legal cases as a government expert (Black and Decker v. U.S.A. and WFC Holdings Corp. (Wells Fargo) v. U.S.A.) where companies claimed tax related benefits as a result from selling some of their business. The government used Hart's research to claim that because the companies retained control of the sold assets, they could not lay claim to the tax benefits.

Personal life
Hart is an American citizen. He is married to Rita B. Goldberg, a Harvard literature professor and author of the second-generation Holocaust memoir Motherland: Growing Up With the Holocaust. They have two sons and two grandsons.

Books
 Firms, Contracts, and Financial Structure (Oxford University Press, 1995).

Selected articles
"On the Optimality of Equilibrium when the Market Structure is Incomplete", Journal of Economic Theory, December 1975, 418–443
 "Takeover Bids, the Free-rider problem, and the Theory of the Corporation" (with Sanford J. Grossman), Bell Journal of Economics, Spring 1980, 42–64
 "An Analysis of the principal–agent problem" (with Sanford J. Grossman), Econometrica (January 1983) 7–46.
 "The Market Mechanism as an Incentive Scheme," Bell Journal of Economics, 14 (Autumn 1983) 366-82.
"The Costs and Benefits of Ownership: A Theory of Vertical and Lateral Integration" (with Sanford J. Grossman), Journal of Political Economy, August 1986, 691–719.
"One Share-One vote and the Market for Corporate Control" (with Sanford J. Grossman), Journal of Financial Economics, 1988
 "Incomplete Contracts and Renegotiation" (with John Hardman Moore), Econometrica 56(4) (July 1988).
 "Property Rights and the Nature of the Firm" (with John Hardman Moore), Journal of Political Economy 98(6) (1990).
 " A Theory of Debt Based on the Inalienability of Human Capital " (with John Hardman Moore), Quarterly Journal of Economics, November 1994, 841–879
 "The Proper Scope of Government: Theory and an Application to Prisons" (with Andrei Shleifer and Robert W. Vishny), Quarterly Journal of Economics 112(4) (1997) 1126–61.
 "Contracts as Reference Points" (with John Hardman Moore), Quarterly Journal of Economics, February 2008,1–48.

Notes

References

External links
Oliver Hart's home page at Harvard
  including the Prize Lecture Incomplete Contracts and Control
 Oliver Hart's publication list

|-

1948 births
Living people
Nobel laureates in Economics
British Nobel laureates
American Nobel laureates
Alumni of King's College, Cambridge
American people of English-Jewish descent
British economists
Law and economics scholars
British Jews
Information economists
Alumni of the University of Warwick
Princeton University alumni
Harvard University faculty
Fellows of Churchill College, Cambridge
Fellows of the Econometric Society
Members of the United States National Academy of Sciences
Academics of the London School of Economics
20th-century American economists
21st-century American economists
Fellows of the American Academy of Arts and Sciences
Corresponding Fellows of the British Academy
Academics from London
Nancy L. Schwartz Memorial Lecture speakers